The Awakening of the Ants is a 2019 Costa Rican drama film directed by Antonella Sudasassi. It was selected as the Costa Rican entry for the Best International Feature Film at the 92nd Academy Awards, but it was not nominated.

Plot
A young wife and mother's imagination helps her escape societal and domestic oppression.

Cast
 Adriana Alvarez as Vanessa
 Leynar Gomez as Alcides

See also
 List of submissions to the 92nd Academy Awards for Best International Feature Film
 List of Costa Rican submissions for the Academy Award for Best International Feature Film

References

External links
 
 

2019 films
2019 drama films
Costa Rican drama films
2010s Spanish-language films